Kamalar Bhimsha Shanappa (16 May 1938 – 9 May 2021) was an Indian politician from the State of Karnataka.

Biography
As member of the Bharatiya Janata Party, he was nominated to the Karnataka Legislative Council, the upper house of the Karnataka Legislature, in 2012, and remained a member till 2018. Between 2006 and 2012, he represented Karnataka in Rajya Sabha, the upper house of the Indian Parliament. Shanappa was a member of the Janata Dal till 1998, when he quit to join Lok Shakti.

Shanappa died on 9 May 2021, aged 83. Having tested positive for COVID-19 and developed complications, he had been hospitalised. He was survived by his wife, two daughters and two sons.

References

External links
 Profile on Rajya Sabha website

1938 births
2021 deaths
Bharatiya Janata Party politicians from Karnataka
Rajya Sabha members from Karnataka
Lok Shakti politicians
Deaths from the COVID-19 pandemic in India
Janata Dal politicians
People from  Kalaburagi district